The Polyamorous Affair is an electronic band based in Los Angeles consisting of producer/songwriter Eddie Chacon and vocalist Sissy Sainte-Marie. The band's self-released debut, The Polyamorous Affair, appeared in 2008. Their sophomore effort, Bolshevik Disco, followed in 2009. The band's third album, Strange Bedfellows, was released in 2010. The Polyamorous Affair is known for its eccentric music videos and multimedia live performances.

In 2009, the band co-headlined the Manimal Festival in Pioneertown, California with Edward Sharpe and the Magnetic Zeros and Warpaint. In 2010, the band contributed "Putting Out Fire," the theme from Cat People, for the David Bowie tribute record released on Manimal Vinyl. In 2010, the band relocated to Berlin and released Strange Bedfellows.

Discography

Studio albums

Singles

Videography

References

Electronic music groups from California
Musical groups from Los Angeles